Sílvia Calvó i Armengol (born 15 October 1969) is an Andorran environmental engineer, current Minister of Environment, Agriculture and Sustainability of Andorra, since 1 April 2015.

Born and raised in Andorra la Vella, in 1993 she graduated in Environmental Technology Engineering from the School of Environmental Engineers of Chambéry and in 1997 he graduated in management from the University of Toulouse. In 2008 she did a master's degree in Business Administration from the University of Nice Sophia Antipolis.

Her entire professional career is being carried out in the Environment Department of the Government of Andorra. From 2002 to 2005 and from 2007 to 2009, he has assumed the direction of this department. She belongs to the electoral coalition Democrats for Andorra (DA) that was formed after the Parliamentary Elections of 2011, in which she was chosen as deputy in the General Council of Andorra.

As a parliamentarian, she has held the presidency of the Economic Legislative Commission and the vice-president of the Health and Environment Commission. She has also been an alternate member of the Andorran Delegation to the Assembly of the Organization for Security and Cooperation in Europe (OSCE) and a member of the Andorran Section in the Assembly of the International Organization of la Francophonie.

Currently since 2015, having been appointed by the Head of Government Antoni Martí, she is the new Minister of Environment, Agriculture and Sustainability of the Principality of Andorra. She was reappointed by the new Prime Minister Xavier Espot on 20 May 2019.

References

External links
 
 File of Consell General

1969 births
Living people
Andorran engineers
21st-century women engineers
Democrats for Andorra politicians
University of Toulouse alumni
Côte d'Azur University alumni
People from Andorra la Vella
Members of the General Council (Andorra)
Women government ministers of Andorra